"The Battle Is The Lord's" is a song by American singer Yolanda Adams.  It was the lead single from her 1993 album Save the World.  It was named Song of the Year at the Stellar Awards in 1994.  A live version was included on her Grammy nominated album Yolanda... Live in Washington. The performance of this song was later featured on her DVD "An Unforgettable Evening With Yolanda Adams" in 2003.

Certifications

References

1996 singles
Yolanda Adams songs
1993 songs